Te Amo (I Love You) is the title of the first studio album released by Panamanian singer-songwriter Makano on November 18, 2008. This album includes the single "Te Amo", which peaked at number-one in the Billboard Hot Latin Tracks chart. Te Amo was nominated for a Lo Nuestro Award for Urban Album of the Year.

Track listing

Chart performance

Certification

References

2008 albums
Makano albums
Machete Music albums
Spanish-language albums